Kürdlər (also, Kurdlyar and Kyurdlyar) is a village and municipality in the Jalilabad Rayon of Azerbaijan.  It has a population of 705.

References 

Populated places in Jalilabad District (Azerbaijan)